The 2015 New York Jets season was the franchise's 46th season in the National Football League and the 56th overall. The team improved on their 4–12 record in 2014 under former head Coach Rex Ryan. Under new head coach Todd Bowles, they succeeded in matching their previous season’s win count in just five games, starting 4–1. Prior to the season, the Jets made a number of moves, including, re-acquiring Darrelle Revis and Antonio Cromartie, two cornerbacks who were instrumental in the Jets previous defensive success, and obtaining Ryan Fitzpatrick and Brandon Marshall in trades. The team regressed to 5–5, before going on a five-game winning streak, clinching their first winning season since 2010. However, it wasn't enough to make the playoffs, as they lost to the Buffalo Bills in Week 17 and the Pittsburgh Steelers defeated the Cleveland Browns. The Steelers, who also finished 10–6, clinched the final AFC playoff spot over the Jets based on a better record vs. common opponents. The Jets finished the season as the league's only team with a winning record to not make the playoffs, and as of 2021, this was the last Jets team to post a winning record. This was also tied with the 2020 Miami Dolphins season as the closest quarterback Ryan Fitzpatrick came to making the playoffs in his 17-year career.

Transactions

Coaching and staff personnel changes
 The Jets fired general manager John Idzik and head coach Rex Ryan on December 29, 2014.
 Offensive line coach Mike Devlin left the Jets to accept the same position with the Houston Texans on January 9, 2015.
 The Jets hired Mike Maccagnan as general manager on January 13, 2015.
 The Jets hired Todd Bowles as head coach on January 14, 2015.
 Jets defensive coordinator Dennis Thurman, defensive line coach Karl Dunbar, linebackers coach Bobby April III, defensive backs coach Tim McDonald, assistant defensive line coach Jeff Weeks, and assistant strength and conditioning coach Jason Oszvart were hired to the same positions by the Buffalo Bills on January 15, 2015. Offensive assistant Tony Sparano Jr. was named tight ends coach on January 15 by the Bills.
 Quarterbacks coach David Lee was hired by the Buffalo Bills for the same position on January 19, 2015.
 The Jets hired Chan Gailey as offensive coordinator on January 20, 2015.
 The Jets hired Kacy Rodgers as defensive coordinator, Bobby April as special teams coordinator, Mike Caldwell as the assistant head coach/inside linebackers coach, Mark Collins as the outside linebackers coach, Joe Danna as the defensive backs coach, Karl Dorrell as the wide receivers coach, and Robby Brown as an offensive quality control coach on January 23, 2015.
 The Jets hired Pepper Johnson as the defensive line coach on January 24, 2015.
 The Jets hired Brian Heimerdinger as director of player personnel on January 27, 2015.
 The Jets hired Steve Marshall as offensive line coach, Marcel Shipp as running backs coach and Kevin Patullo as quarterbacks coach on January 27, 2015.
 The Jets hired Rex Hogan as senior director of college scouting on January 29, 2015.
 The Jets hired Jimmie Johnson as tight ends coach, Daylon McCutcheon as assistant defensive backs coach, and Ryan Slowik as assistant defensive line/defensive quality control coach on January 29, 2015.
 The Jets named Ron Heller as assistant offensive line coach and Steve Hagen as assistant special teams coach on February 3, 2015.
 The Jets hired John Scott, Jr. as a defensive quality control coach on February 11, 2015.
 The Jets fired director of pro personnel Brendan Prophett on May 4, 2015.

Arrivals
The Jets signed Andrew Furney, Mario Harvey, Keith Lewis, Dashaun Phillips, Brent Qvale, Daryl Richardson, Jake Schum and Chris Young to reserve/future contracts on December 30, 2014.
The Jets signed Sean Hooey to a reserve/future contract on January 24, 2015.
The Jets signed Curtis Brown on February 10, 2015.
The Jets signed Ronald Talley on March 4, 2015.
The Jets signed Buster Skrine, Darrelle Revis and James Carpenter on March 11, 2015.
The Jets signed Antonio Cromartie and Marcus Gilchrist on March 18, 2015.
The Jets signed James Brewer on March 19, 2015.
The Jets signed Kevin Vickerson, Stephen Bowen and Corey Hilliard on March 24, 2015.
The Jets signed Kellen Davis on March 25, 2015.
The Jets signed Jamari Lattimore on April 1, 2015.
The Jets signed Erin Henderson on April 8, 2015.
The Jets signed Stevan Ridley and Joe Mays on April 13, 2015.
The Jets signed Julian Howsare, Greg Henderson, Jordan Williams, Durell Eskridge, Davon Walls, Demarkus Perkins, Wes Saxton, Taiwan Jones, and Deion Barnes on May 8, 2015.
The Jets signed Jake Heaps and J. C. Copeland on May 11, 2015.
The Jets signed Jonathon Rumph on June 1, 2015.
The Jets signed Charles Brown on June 12, 2015.
The Jets signed Steve Maneri on June 15, 2015.
The Jets signed Austin Hill on July 28, 2015.
The Jets signed Jarrod West on August 2, 2015.
The Jets signed Arthur Williams on August 4, 2015.
The Jets signed Keon Lyn on August 7, 2015.
The Jets signed Javier Arenas on August 11, 2015.
The Jets claimed Arthur Lynch off waivers on August 18, 2015.
The Jets signed Matt Flynn on August 19, 2015.
The Jets signed Matt LaCosse on August 24, 2015.
The Jets signed Bryan Johnson on August 25, 2015.
The Jets signed Josh Johnson on August 27, 2015.
The Jets signed Ronald Martin and Chris Owusu on September 6, 2015.
The Jets signed Deion Barnes, Julian Howsare, Wesley Johnson, Taiwan Jones, Keon Lyn, Walt Powell, Wes Saxton and Jordan Williams to the practice squad on September 6, 2015.
The Jets signed Rontez Miles to the Practice Squad on September 7, 2015.

Departures
The Jets released Percy Harvin on March 10, 2015.
The Jets released Chris Pantale, Chris Young, and Mario Harvey and Corey Hilliard retired on May 8, 2015.
The Jets released Demarkus Perkins and Greg Henderson on May 11, 2015.
The Jets released Matt Simms on May 28, 2015.
The Jets released Sean Hooey on June 11, 2015.
The Jets released Andrew Furney on July 28, 2015.
The Jets released J. C. Copeland on August 1, 2015.
The Jets released Jarrod West on August 4, 2015.
The Jets waived Antonio Allen on August 7, 2015.
The Jets released Ikemefuna Enemkpali on August 11, 2015.
The Jets released Jake Schum on August 18, 2015.
The Jets waived Arthur Williams on August 19, 2015.
The Jets waived Davon Walls on August 24, 2015.
The Jets released Steve Maneri on August 25, 2015.
The Jets released Jake Heaps on August 27, 2015.
The Jets released Javier Arenas, James Brewer, Curtis Brown, Dalton Freeman, T.J. Graham, Saalim Hakim, Austin Hill, Bryan Johnson, Matt LaCosse, Keith Lewis, DeVier Posey and Jonathon Rumph on August 30, 2015.
The Jets waived Dashaun Phillips on September 1, 2015.
The Jets released Jason Babin, Deion Barnes, Charles Brown, Durell Eskridge, Shaquelle Evans, Matt Flynn, Julian Howsare, Josh Johnson, Wesley Johnson, Taiwan Jones, Keon Lyn, Arthur Lynch, Joe Mays, Walt Powell, Chris Owusu, Daryl Richardson, Wes Saxton, Ronald Talley and Jordan Williams on September 5, 2015.
The Jets waived Rontez Miles on September 6, 2015.
The Jets waived Oday Aboushi on September 15, 2015.
The Jets released Kevin Vickerson on September 16, 2015.
The Jets waived Quinton Coples on November 23, 2015.

Trades

To Jets
The Chicago Bears traded Brandon Marshall and a 2015 seventh round (224th overall) draft pick to the Jets for New York's 2015 fifth round (142nd overall) draft pick on March 10, 2015.
The Houston Texans traded Ryan Fitzpatrick to the Jets for a 2016 late-round conditional draft pick on March 11, 2015.
The Houston Texans traded DeVier Posey and their 2015 third round (82nd overall), fifth round (152nd overall), and seventh round (229th overall) draft picks to the Jets for New York's 2015 third round (70th overall) draft pick on May 1, 2015. 
The St. Louis Rams traded Zac Stacy to the Jets for New York's 2015 seventh round (224th overall) pick on May 2, 2015.

From Jets
The Jets traded their 2015 fourth round (104th overall) and seventh round (224th overall) draft picks to the Jacksonville Jaguars for Jacksonville's 2015 fourth round (103rd overall) draft pick on May 2, 2015.

Free agents

Draft

Schedule
On November 6, 2014, the NFL announced that the Jets were scheduled to visit the Miami Dolphins at Wembley Stadium in London, England as part of the International Series. This became the first time that a divisional match has taken place in London. The game occurred on Sunday, October 4, and aired on CBS in the United States. The kickoff time was 9:30 a.m. EDT (2:30 p.m. local time). Miami is to be the designated home team for this game, and both teams will have their bye the following week.

The remainder of the Jets' 2015 schedule was announced on April 21.

Preseason

Regular season

Note: Intra-division opponents are in bold text.

Standings

Division

Conference

Staff

Final roster

Regular season results

Week 1: vs. Cleveland Browns

The Jets open the 2015 season with a resounding 31-10 win over the Cleveland Browns at Metlife Stadium to open Todd Bowles' tenure as Jets HC, replacing Rex Ryan, who manned the sidelines for the past six seasons. The Jets had five takeaways against Cleveland, including a Johnny Manziel interception. Fitzpatrick had a solid debut, throwing 2 TDs to Marshall (1 yard) and Decker (15 yards) respectively. Chris Ivory also had a good day, rushing for 91 yards and 2 TDs, the second of which sealed the game in the 4th quarter.

Week 2: at Indianapolis Colts

The Jets defeated the Indianapolis Colts 20-7 in a sloppy Monday Night Matchup at Lucas Oil Stadium in Indianapolis. The Jets defense forced five turnovers, intercepting Andrew Luck, the league leader in TD passes last year, three times. A 26-yd touchdown reception by Donte Moncrief cut the Jets lead to three points (10-7), before a clutch seven-play, 80-yd TD drive culminating in a 15-yd TD pass to Marshall sealed the win for New York.

Week 3: vs. Philadelphia Eagles

After the Jets' upset win against the Colts on Monday night, they headed back to MetLife Stadium to face the Eagles. With 2014 rushing champ DeMarco Murray, who had rushed for 11 yards on 21 carries, injured, the Eagles rushing attack was explosive under Ryan Mathews and Darren Sproles. Philadelphia quickly jumped to a 24-0 lead in the 2nd quarter, intercepting Ryan Fitzpatrick 3 times (although 2 of them were batted passes or botched catches). New York scored 17 unanswered, however the Jets couldn't capitalize on many opportunities and Philadelphia won 24-17. The Eagles remain as the only NFL team that the Jets have never defeated in franchise history, as the Eagles improved their all-time head-to-head record against the Jets to 10–0. This game was also known for Brandon Marshall’s attempt to pitch the ball backwards to his teammate, which result in a fumble recover for the Eagles.

Week 4: at Miami Dolphins
NFL International Series

The New York Jets traveled across the pond for the first time in franchise history to face their AFC East rival, the Miami Dolphins. The offense, led by QB Ryan Fitzpatrick, got off to a quick start with a 58-yard heave to Brandon Marshall and a 3-yard touchdown run by Chris Ivory to put the Jets up 7-0. The Jets defense dominated the Dolphins offense for the majority of the game, shutting down Ryan Tannehill, however the Dolphins pulled within 2 scores in the 4th quarter. NYJ forced 2 interceptions, both in the fourth quarter, to put the game away. The New York Jets won 27-14, and improved their record to 3-1 heading into their bye week.

Week 6: vs. Washington Redskins
After their bye week, New York returned home to face the Washington Redskins. In the first half, Washington played extremely aggressive on defense, forcing 3 turnovers. In the third quarter, the Jets' offense exploded, scoring 17 points, and the defense intercepted Washington QB Kirk Cousins twice to seal the deal. In the victory, Brandon Marshall became the first Jets receiver since Don Maynard in 1968 to have 4 straight 100-yard games, and Chris Ivory recorded a career-high 196 total yards With the win, the Jets improved to 4-1.

Week 7: at New England Patriots

The Jets travel to New England to take on the Patriots. With the Jets leading 17-16 in the second half, the Jets were in position to strengthen their lead when Brandon Marshall dropped a TD, leading to a FG making the advantage 20-16.  However, touchdowns to Danny Amendola and Rob Gronkowski ended those hopes and the Jets would go on to lose, 30-23 in which many plays and questionable decisions were left on the field by the coaching staff.

Week 8: at Oakland Raiders
With the loss, the Jets fell to 4-3.

Week 9: vs. Jacksonville Jaguars

With the win, the Jets broke their 2-game losing streak.

Week 10: vs. Buffalo Bills

As part of Nike's NFL color rush on Thursday Night Football, the Jets wore kelly green uniforms.

Week 11: at Houston Texans

The Jets not only lost the game, but they lost their No 1 cornerback Darrelle Revis to a concussion. With the loss, they fell to 5-5.

Week 12: vs. Miami Dolphins
With the win, the Jets improved to 6-5.

Week 13: at New York Giants

The New York Jets came back from a 20-10 deficit to beat the New York Giants with an interception by Rontez Miles and a Randy Bullock field goal with a late 4th quarter touchdown to Brandon Marshall to send it to overtime. Randy Bullock's field goal put the Jets up 23-20. The Jets sealed the victory with Josh Brown missing his third field goal attempt of the game. The Jets improve to 5-8 all time against the Giants.

Week 14: vs. Tennessee Titans
With the win, the Jets improved to 8-5.

Week 15: at Dallas Cowboys

With the win, the Jets improved to 9-5 and secured their first winning season since 2010, as well as eliminating the Cowboys from playoff contention.

Week 16: vs. New England Patriots
This game is well known for the coin toss to start overtime. The Patriots would win the toss, choosing heads. However, instead of receiving the ball to give Tom Brady the first chance to score, the Patriots elected to kick. This caused much confusion in Patriots captain Matthew Slater, as he questioned after the toss if the Patriots, because they won the toss, would also get to choose which end of the field they would like to kick. However, referee Clete Blakeman said "You elected to kick", and the Patriots were unable to choose which end of the field to kick off to, as in the NFL rule book, the team that loses the coin toss gets to choose which end to receive the ball, if the team that wins the toss elects to defer. If the team that wins the coin toss receives, the team that loses the toss will elect which way to kick. The Jets would get the ball first. They would march right down the field to score the game-winning touchdown on their first possession as Ryan Fitzpatrick found Eric Decker to end the game with a touchdown. With their fifth straight win, the Jets improved to 10-5.

As of 2022, this is last time the Jets have beaten the Patriots.

Week 17: at Buffalo Bills
With the loss, and with the Steelers defeating the Browns the same day, the Jets finished their season 10-6 and were eliminated from the playoffs. This was also the first time since 2004 that one NFL team defeated another twice in the same season and both games ended with the same score. The Jets were also seeking a 6-game winning streak for the first time since 1986. It was also quarterback Ryan Fitzpatrick's first return to Buffalo since the Bills released him following the 2012 season. Fitzpatrick played for the Bills from 2009 to 2012.

References

External links
 

New York Jets
New York Jets seasons
New York Jets season
21st century in East Rutherford, New Jersey
Meadowlands Sports Complex